Aleksejs Saramotins (born 8 April 1982) is a Latvian professional road cyclist, who last rode for UCI Continental team . He has won the Latvian National Road Race Championships on seven occasions and has represented his country at the Summer Olympic Games and the UCI Road World Championships.

Career

Amateur career
Before signing a professional contract Saramotins raced in cross-country mountain biking races.

Professional career
Saramotins left his team of two years  at the end of the 2012 season, and joined the new  team for the 2013 season.

In October 2016 he and  teammate Matteo Pelucchi were announced as members of the  squad for 2017. After two years, he joined  for the 2019 season.

Major results

2004
 3rd Road race, National Road Championships
2005
 1st  Road race, National Road Championships
 5th Tallinn–Tartu GP
 8th Overall Szlakiem Grodów Piastowskich
 8th Overall Okolo Slovenska
2006
 1st  Road race, National Road Championships
 2nd Mayor Cup
 2nd Memorial Oleg Dyachenko
 2nd Riga Grand Prix
 4th Overall Circuit des Ardennes
 5th Tallinn–Tartu GP
 6th Scandinavian Open Road Race
 9th Tartu GP
2007
 National Road Championships
1st  Road race
3rd Time trial
 1st Stage 4 Tour of Croatia
 2nd Memorial Oleg Dyachenko
 2nd Tallinn–Tartu GP
 2nd Riga Grand Prix
 3rd Mayor Cup
 3rd Puchar Ministra Obrony Narodowej
 4th Tartu GP
 6th Overall Five Rings of Moscow
 6th Grand Prix de la Ville de Lillers
2008
 1st Lombardia Tour
 1st Tartu GP
 1st Scandinavian Open Road Race
 1st Stage 1 Circuit des Ardennes
 1st Stage 3 Okolo Slovenska
 2nd Tour du Finistère
 3rd Riga Grand Prix
 3rd Le Samyn
 9th Paris–Troyes
 9th Mayor Cup
 10th Overall Tour de Normandie
2009
 1st Grand Prix de la Ville de Lillers
 1st Druivenkoers Overijse
 1st Münsterland Giro
 1st Stage 3 Ronde de l'Oise
 National Road Championships
2nd Road race
2nd Time trial
 2nd Tartu GP
 2nd Duo Normand (with Sergey Firsanov)
 4th Grand Prix Cristal Energie
 7th Overall Les 3 Jours de Vaucluse
2010
 National Road Championships
1st  Road race
2nd Time trial
 1st Grand Prix d'Isbergues
 1st Pirita GP Tallinn VII Lauri Aus Memoriaal
 5th Tartu GP
2011
 National Road Championships
2nd Road race
2nd Time trial
 8th Binche–Tournai–Binche
 10th Le Samyn
2012
 National Road Championships
1st  Road race
2nd Time trial
 7th Overall Boucles de la Mayenne
 7th Tro-Bro Léon
 9th Overall Tour du Limousin
 10th Eschborn–Frankfurt – Rund um den Finanzplatz
2013
 National Road Championships
1st  Road race
2nd Time trial
 1st Tour du Doubs
 2nd Tour du Jura
 5th Strade Bianche
 9th Polynormande
2014
 1st Stage 5 (ITT) Vuelta a Burgos
 National Road Championships
2nd Road race
2nd Time trial
 5th Chrono des Nations
2015
 National Road Championships
1st  Road race
2nd Time trial
 7th Road race, European Games
2016
 2nd Time trial, National Road Championships
 3rd Clásica de Almería
 8th Paris–Roubaix
2017
 1st  Time trial, National Road Championships
2018
 National Road Championships
2nd Road race
3rd Time trial
 3rd Overall Czech Cycling Tour
1st Stage 1 (TTT)
 4th Grand Prix Pino Cerami
2019
 National Road Championships
2nd Road race
2nd Time trial
 5th Overall Tour de Tochigi

Grand Tour general classification results timeline

References

External links
 
 

1982 births
Living people
Latvian male cyclists
Cyclists at the 2012 Summer Olympics
Cyclists at the 2016 Summer Olympics
Olympic cyclists of Latvia
Sportspeople from Riga
Cyclists at the 2015 European Games
European Games competitors for Latvia
Cyclists at the 2019 European Games